The 2020 Northern Illinois Huskies football team represented Northern Illinois University as a member of the West Division of the Mid-American Conference (MAC) during the 2020 NCAA Division I FBS football season. Led by second-year head coach Thomas Hammock in a season shorted due to the COVID-19 pandemic, the Huskies compiled an overall record of 0–6 with an identical mark in MAC play, placing last out of six teams in the West Division. Northern Illinois played home games at Huskie Stadium in DeKalb, Illinois.

Previous season
The Huskies finished the 2019 season 5–7, 4–4 in MAC play to finish in a tie for third place in the West Division.

COVID-19 effects on season
On August 8, 2020, the MAC announced that it was postponing the 2020 football season due to the ongoing COVID-19 pandemic. The conference announced it would explore playing a season in the spring of 2021. It was the first major football conference to announce the postponement of the season.

On September 25, the conference voted to reinstate the football season beginning on November 4. The conference was the last major conference to reinstate football.

Schedule
Northern Illinois had games scheduled against Iowa, Maryland, and Rhode Island, which were canceled due to the COVID-19 pandemic. As a result, the team played a conference-only schedule.

References

Northern Illinois
Northern Illinois Huskies football seasons
Northern Illinois Huskies football
College football winless seasons